The NCAA softball championship was the softball tournament of the National Collegiate Athletic Association in the Philippines.  The tournament was discontinued in 1986.

Champions

Number of championships by school

NOTE
 LSGH won its six (6) championships under DLSU. It now plays under CSB.

See also
 UAAP Softball Championship

References

Champions list at the official NCAA Philippines website
Presidents and hosts list at the official NCAA Philippines website

Softball
Softball competitions